Mezinovac is a village in Perušić, Croatia. In 2011, the population was 24.

References

Populated places in Lika-Senj County